Winona Brooks (2 January 2000 – 5 March 2022), better known by her stage name Lil Bo Weep (and also known by the name Unaloon) was an Australian singer, rapper, and video blogger.

Biography 
Winona Brooks was born in 2000 in Adelaide, Australia. She moved to Los Angeles, California after high school to attend college and graduate, but later had to return to Australia with her family as part of an emergency DFAT repatriation.

She started releasing tracks on SoundCloud in 2015. She was originally scheduled to feature on XXXTentacion's debut album 17, but Onfroy ended up not adding the song to the album.

On 27 February 2022, on her Instagram account, she announced that she had been pregnant in 2021, but had lost her child.

Death 
Brooks died on 5 March 2022. Her father Matthew broke the news on Facebook:

In her last post on her Instagram page, dated 2 March 2022, she explained that she was on heavy medication due to Complex Post-Traumatic Stress Disorder (CPTSD) and that she was "mourning the loss of her child".

Discography 
Compilation albums
Solos (self-released, 2017)
Solos 2 (self-released, 2018)

EPs
Healing Unaloon (self-released, 2017 – credited to Unaloon and Lil Bo Weep)
Dedicationz 1 (self-released, 2021)
Illusions (self-released, 2021)

References

2000 births
2022 deaths
Australian women rappers
Musicians from Adelaide
Australian video bloggers
Women video bloggers